Robert Anwood is the pseudonym of the author of the humour book Bears Can't Run Downhill. it was followed by a sequel in September 2007, Emus Can't Walk Backwards.

Writes for the web under the pen name of Siegfried Baboon.

As of October 2007, Robert Anwood appeared as a character called "Fact Man" on Lorna Milton's afternoon show on BBC Three Counties Radio.

Anwood has been the keyboard player for Oxford-based indie band Jody and the Jerms since 2019.

References

External links
robertanwood.com official site
myspace.com/robertanwood MySpace page
gearchange.org Truck Driver's Gear Change Hall of Shame (written as Siegfried Baboon)
author page on Random House website

British humorists
Living people
Year of birth missing (living people)